Guidugli is a surname. Notable people with the surname include:

Gino Guidugli (born 1983), American football player and coach
Benjamin Guidugli (born 1987), American football player